Eastern Championship Wrestling/Extreme Championship Wrestling (ECW) is a defunct professional wrestling promotion based in Philadelphia, Pennsylvania that operated from 1992 to 2001. Over the course of its existence, ECW staged regular supercards and, beginning in 1997, pay-per-view events. From June 1993 to August 1994, events were promoted under the Eastern Championship Wrestling banner; from August 1994 to January 2001, the Extreme Championship Wrestling banner was used.

Events

1993

1994

1995

1996

1997

1998

1999

2000

2001

See also

List of All Elite Wrestling pay-per-view events
List of FMW supercards and pay-per-view events
List of Global Force Wrestling events and specials
List of Impact Wrestling pay-per-view events
List of Major League Wrestling events
List of National Wrestling Alliance pay-per-view events
List of NJPW pay-per-view events
List of NWA/WCW closed-circuit events and pay-per-view events
List of Ring of Honor pay-per-view events
List of Smokey Mountain Wrestling supercard events
List of WCW Clash of the Champions shows
List of World Class Championship Wrestling Supercard events
List of WWA pay-per-view events
List of WWE pay-per-view and WWE Network events
List of WWE Saturday Night Main Event shows
List of WWE Tribute to the Troops shows

External links
List of ECW events from 1992 to 2001
List of ECW, WCW and WWE pay-per-view events on the WWE Network

Extreme Championship Wrestling
Professional wrestling-related lists